Samuel Young (14 February 1883 – 28 November 1954) was an Irish footballer who played as a winger. Young played club football in Ireland, Scotland and England for Linfield, Airdrie and Portsmouth. Young also played at international level for Ireland, scoring two goals in the 1914 British Home Championship.

References

1883 births
Irish association footballers (before 1923)
Pre-1950 IFA international footballers
Linfield F.C. players
Airdrieonians F.C. (1878) players
Portsmouth F.C. players
Scottish Football League players
Association football wingers
1954 deaths
Southern Football League players